Quantum economics is an emerging research field which applies mathematical methods and ideas from quantum physics to the field of economics. It is motivated by the belief that economic processes such as financial transactions have much in common with quantum processes, and can be appropriately modeled using the quantum formalism. It draws on techniques from the related areas of quantum finance and quantum cognition, and is a sub-field of quantum social science.

History 
A number of economists including Paul Samuelson and  Bernard Schmitt (whose "quantum macroeconomics" treated production as an instantaneous emission) have found inspiration in quantum theory. Perhaps the first to directly exploit quantum techniques in economic analysis, however, was the Pakistani mathematician Asghar Qadir. In his 1978 paper Quantum Economics, he argued that the formalism of quantum mechanics is the best mathematical framework for modeling situations where "consumer behavior depends on infinitely many factors and that the consumer is not aware of any preference until the matter is brought up." He proposed that, like particles in quantum mechanics, "the individual as an entity ... can be thought of as a point in a Hilbert space."

Qadir's paper received little attention. However, during the 1990s, workers in the field of quantum cognition indeed showed that many aspects of human decision-making, including those involved in economic decisions, seemed to follow a kind of quantum logic. At the same time, researchers such as economist Martin Shubik, physicist Martin Schaden and social scientist Emmanuel Haven were beginning to use the quantum formalism to model the uncertainty of stock markets.

In his 2007 book Quantum Finance: Path Integrals and Hamiltonians for Options and Interest Rates, Belal E. Baaquie showed how methods from quantum physics could be applied to things like the pricing of financial options. However he wrote that the ‘’larger question of applying the formalism and insights of (quantum) physics to economics, and which forms a part of the larger subject of econophysics, is left for future research.’’ In a 2010 review, Schaden noted that quantum techniques could only be justified if the financial system could be shown to exhibit quantum properties such as entanglement, and if their use led to genuine simplifications over existing stochastic approaches. In their 2013 book Quantum Social Science, Emmanuel Haven and Andrei Khrennikov extended Baaquie’s work in finance to questions such as arbitrage and the reflexivity theory of George Soros.

In a 2016 paper and book (the latter co-authored with journalist Roman Chlupatý), the mathematician David Orrell proposed a quantum theory of money and value, which states that money has dualistic, quantum properties because of the way that it merges the exact concept of number with the fuzzy concept of value, and the use of money leads to mental and financial entanglement which can be modeled using quantum methods. In his 2018 book Quantum Economics: The New Science of Money and other works  he described a quantum economics which combined this view of money with the insights of quantum finance and quantum social science. In a 2019 article for the Bretton Woods Committee, Andrew Sheng wrote that “A quantum paradigm of finance and the economy is slowly emerging, and its nonlinear, complex nature may help the design of a future global economy and financial architecture ... Financial assets and virtual liabilities have quantum characteristics of entanglement with each other that are not yet fully understood."

Description 
Just as quantum physics differs in fundamental ways from classical physics, quantum economics differs from neoclassical economics in a number of key respects.

Neoclassical economics is based on expected utility theory, which combines utility theory to model people’s preferences, and probability theory to model expectations under uncertainty. However the field of quantum cognition calls these assumptions into question, since people don’t necessarily have fixed preferences, or base their decisions on probability theory. Many of the findings of behavioral economics are inconsistent with classical logic, but agree with quantum decision theory of the sort assumed in quantum social science.

In financial applications, neoclassical economics is associated with efficient market theory, where price is assumed to reflect intrinsic value with a degree of random noise due to new information. In quantum economics, price fluctuations are seen as being due to fundamental uncertainty.

Neoclassical economics assumes that people act independently while making economic decisions. Quantum economics notes that financial actors are part of an entangled system, as in quantum game theory.

Quantum economics also stresses the importance of financial transactions and in particular the role of money as an active force in the economy, for example in the way that it entangles debtors and creditors through loans. Quantum economics can therefore be viewed as an alternative to neoclassical economics which begins from a different set of assumptions.

References 

Mathematical economics
Quantum mechanics
Schools of economic thought